Cartersville is an unincorporated community in Cerro Gordo County, in the U.S. state of Iowa.

History
A post office was established at Cartersville in 1900, and remained in operation until it was discontinued in 1943. The community was named after the novel Col. Carter of Cartersville by Francis Hopkinson Smith.

References

Unincorporated communities in Cerro Gordo County, Iowa
Unincorporated communities in Iowa